Colón is a small city in Buenos Aires Province, Argentina. It is the administrative centre for Colón Partido.

The town is located in an agricultural area, the main areas of employment are in agriculture, the production of agricultural machinery and textiles.

The local museum is housed at the former Ferrocarril General Bartolomé Mitre railway station and has a display of old photographs and artifacts.

External links

Populated places in Buenos Aires Province
Populated places established in 1892
1892 establishments in Argentina